Mitra and Varuna are two deities frequently referred to in the ancient Indian scripture of the Rigveda. They are both considered Ādityas, or deities connected with the Sun; and they are protectors of the righteous order of rita. Their connection is so close that they are frequently linked in the dvandva compound Mitra–Varuna.

Mitra-Varuna is also the title of a 1940 essay in comparative Indo-European mythology by Georges Dumézil.

See also
 Mitra (Vedic)
 Varuna

References

Adityas
Hindu gods
Homosexuality and bisexuality deities
LGBT themes in mythology
Love and lust gods